was a  after Eiso and before Chōhō. This period spanned the years from February 995  through January 999.

Change of era
 995 : The new era name was created to mark an event or a number of events. The previous era ended and a new one commenced in Shōryaku 6, on 22 February 995.

Events of the Chōtoku era
 995 (Chōtoku 1): Fujiwara no Michinaga is given the office of Udaijin.
 996 (Chōtoku 2, 7th month): Michinaga become Sadaijin; and Fujiwara no Akimitsu is named Udaijin.

Notes

References
 Brown, Delmer M. and Ichirō Ishida, eds. (1979).  Gukanshō: The Future and the Past. Berkeley: University of California Press. ;  OCLC 251325323
 Nussbaum, Louis-Frédéric and Käthe Roth. (2005).  Japan encyclopedia. Cambridge: Harvard University Press. ;  OCLC 58053128
 Titsingh, Isaac. (1834). Nihon Odai Ichiran; ou,  Annales des empereurs du Japon.  Paris: Royal Asiatic Society, Oriental Translation Fund of Great Britain and Ireland. OCLC 5850691
 Varley, H. Paul. (1980). A Chronicle of Gods and Sovereigns: Jinnō Shōtōki of Kitabatake Chikafusa. New York: Columbia University Press. ;  OCLC 6042764

External links
 National Diet Library, "The Japanese Calendar" -- historical overview plus illustrative images from library's collection

Japanese eras
10th century in Japan